Paul B. "Skip" Stam Jr. (born September 5, 1950) was a Republican member of the North Carolina General Assembly representing the state's 37th House district, including constituents in Wake County. An attorney from Apex, North Carolina, Stam was elected to his seventh (non-consecutive) term in the state House of Representatives in 2012. He was first elected in 1988, but was defeated for re-election in 1990. He ran unsuccessfully for the state Senate and for the North Carolina Court of Appeals (in 1998 and 2000) before being elected to the House again in 2002.

Tenure
Stam won re-election from the 37th district in the 2004 election, defeating Libertarian H. Wade Minter in the November general election. In 2006, Stam was unsuccessfully challenged by Ed Ridpath (vote count: Stam 15,459 votes, Ridpath 11,628).

In December 2006, Stam and Rep. Fred Steen ran for House Republican Leader after Joe Kiser stepped down from the position.  Stam was elected by his fellow House Republicans to the post. After Republicans won a majority in the state House in the 2010 elections, Stam lost a vote to become the party's nominee for Speaker of the House to Representative Thom Tillis, but was elected Majority Leader instead. Following the 2012 elections, Stam was elected Speaker Pro Tempore, taking office in Jan. 2013.

At the close of the 2015 legislative session, Stam announced his intent to retire at the conclusion of the 2016 legislative session.  The American Conservative Union gave him a lifetime legislative score of 93%.

Controversies
In February 2013, Stam drew criticism from news media when he maneuvered the House Rules Committee into giving an "unfavorable report" on a bill to stop arresting medical patients who use marijuana, prohibiting consideration of any similar measure for two years. After spending a total of 20 minutes on the bill, Stam accused constituents of harassing him and other legislators by sending them emails and phone calls encouraging them to vote for the bill. The nonprofit Marijuana Policy Project replied, "Despite what Rep. Stam said, elected officials need to hear from their constituents."

In June 2014, in the course of a debate over a proposal to prohibit charter schools from discriminating in hiring or admissions on the grounds of "sexual orientation or gender identity,"  Stam passed out a handout describing pedophilia, necrophilia and bestiality as "sexual orientations" (the language was taken from an obsolete edition of the American Psychiatric Association's Diagnostic and Statistical Manual of Mental Disorders). "Many, many sexual orientations are not ones you want to have teaching kids in school. You may think you know what you mean by this, but you don't," Stam said. He refused to further explain the list, which he had previously passed around when arguing against including sexual orientation in the state's statute against school bullying in 2010. Speaker Tillis' office later issued a statement characterizing Stam's remarks as "not helpful".

In March, 2016 Stam co-sponsored Public Facilities Privacy & Security Act, commonly known as House Bill 2.

Electoral history

2014

2012

2010

2008

2006

2004

2002

References

External links
NCGA bio page
Project Vote Smart
Website

|-

|-

|-

|-

Living people
1950 births
People from Princeton, New Jersey
People from Apex, North Carolina
Michigan State University alumni
University of North Carolina at Chapel Hill alumni
20th-century American politicians
21st-century American politicians
Republican Party members of the North Carolina House of Representatives